Ingaleshwara  is a village in the southern state of Karnataka, India. It is located in the Basavana Bagevadi taluk of Bijapur district in Karnataka.
Ingaleshwar is the birthplace of Shri Basaveshwara (Basavanna), the 12th century Saint.

Demographics
 India census, Ingaleshwar had a population of 6926 with 3553 males and 3373 females.

See also
 Bijapur district
 Districts of Karnataka

References

External links
 http://Bijapur.nic.in/

Villages in Bijapur district, Karnataka